Cambridge Montessori School is a private American Montessori Society and Association of Independent Schools of New England certified private Montessori school that was founded in 1963 in Cambridge, Massachusetts. It offers preschool, kindergarten, primary, elementary, and middle school education.

Campus 
As of 2012, Cambridge Montessori School has grown to 221 students with three distinct campuses. Since 1974, CMS's Toddler/Primary Program (21months through Kindergarten) has been situated at 161 Garden Street in Cambridge, adjacent to Danehy Park. CMS added the Elementary Building (grades 1–6) at 129 Sherman St. in 1997. In 2008, the School rented 5,000 additional square feet in the Brickyard Office Park, midway between its existing buildings, for additional office, studio, and classroom space for arts and the Middle School. In 2014, the brickyard space was further expanded and now houses 5 additional administrative offices and a conference room.

Programs 
 Toddler Program - For children 21 months through age 3. Activities are changed regularly in response to children's need for variety and challenge.
 Primary Program - The Primary program is for children from 3 to 6 years. It is a mixed-age environment where children spend three years in the same classroom.
 Elementary Program - For students 6 to 12 years old, is organized as two three-year cycles: Lower Elementary for 6- to 9-year-old students and Upper Elementary for 9- to 12-year-old students.
 Middle School Program - For students 12 to 14 years old. It includes a two-year interdisciplinary curriculum inside and outside of the classroom.
 Passport Program - Includes Early Care, After School Care, Clubs, Athletics and Camps (Summer and School vacation).

Faculty and staff 
 Interim Head of School - Susan Morrissey
 15 full and part-time admin and support staff
 45 full and part-time teachers

See also 
Cambridge, Massachusetts#Primary and secondary private education

References

External links 
 Official Cambridge Montessori website (CMS)
 CMS review from Association of Independent Schools in New England
 American Montessori Society Accreditation list
 CMS Toddler Program
 CMS Primary Program
 CMS Elementary Program
 CMS Middle School Program
 CMS Passport Program

Private elementary schools in Massachusetts
Private middle schools in Massachusetts
Montessori schools in the United States
Schools in Middlesex County, Massachusetts